Cyril Frost Kennedy, ED (20 April 1915 – 12 January 1974) was a Progressive Conservative party member of the House of Commons of Canada.

Early life
Kennedy was born in Hilden, Nova Scotia to Liberal-Conservative Nova Scotia MLA Robert H. Kennedy along with nine siblings.

He took up lumber work and carpentry working with the family sawmill until joining the Canadian Army.

Military life
Kennedy became a commissioned officer in 1936 as part of The North Nova Scotia Highlanders. He participated in the 1938 Army Operational Shooting Competition in England as part of the Canadian contingent. In 1940, he volunteered for overseas service and on 6 June 1944 fought at Juno Beach as Officer Commanding of his regiment's "D" Company. On 7 June he was engaged in fighting in Buron where elements of the 12th SS Panzer Division had attacked. Two other North Nova Scotia companies were encircled and surrendered (and some of the prisoners were executed during the Ardenne Abbey Massacre), but "D" Company dug in and after four hours of fighting were able to repulse the German advance with limited support.

Kennedy was promoted to the rank of major. His arm was injured during the Battle of the Scheldt, which required amputation.

Politics
He was first elected at the Colchester—Hants riding in the 1957 general election, then re-elected there in 1958, 1962, 1963 and 1965. On 17 September 1967, Kennedy left the House of Commons before the end of his term in the 27th Canadian Parliament and did not campaign for any further re-election.

Electoral record

References

External links
 

1915 births
1974 deaths
Members of the House of Commons of Canada from Nova Scotia
Progressive Conservative Party of Canada MPs
Canadian Army personnel of World War II